is the 30th single by Japanese singer Yōko Oginome. Written by Narada Michael Walden, Walter Afanasieff, and Jeffrey Cohen, the single was released on November 21, 1993, by Victor Entertainment. Aside from being Oginome's first English-language single, it was her first single to not appear on Oricon's singles chart.

Background and release
Originally featured in Oginome's 1988 English-language album Verge of Love, "Passages of Time" and "Something About You" were re-recorded with a new arrangement by Rod Antoon, who produced her 1994 album Scandal. The jacket cover was illustrated by Oginome herself.

Track listing
All music is arranged by Rod Antoon.

References

External links

1993 singles
Yōko Oginome songs
English-language Japanese songs
Songs written by Narada Michael Walden
Songs written by Walter Afanasieff
Songs written by Jeff Cohen (songwriter)
Victor Entertainment singles